Lopukhiv is a village in Tiachiv Raion of Zakarpattia Oblast in Ukraine.

History
Lopukhiv first mentioned in 1638, when the village was called Brusztura. It comes from the Romanian word "brustur", meaning heart-shaped comfrey. After it was incorporated into the Ukrainian SSR as part of the Ukrainianization of the Carpathians, the village was renamed Lopukhiv.

Geography
Lopukhiv is located on both sides of the river Brusturyanka,  from the district center Tiachiv.

Demographics
Native language as of the Ukrainian Census of 2001:
 Ukrainian 99.64%
 Others 0.36%

References

Villages in Tiachiv Raion